The 1904 Toronto Argonauts season was the club's 18th season of organized league play since its inception in 1873. The team finished in a three-way tie for first place in District 1 of the senior series of the Ontario Rugby Football Union with two wins and two losses, and lost the resulting tie-break semi-final game to the Toronto Rugby Club.

Regular season
For the 1904 season, the ORFU senior series was configured into two three-team districts, the champions of which faced each other in a playoff to determine the league champions. By virtue of tie-break victories over the Argonauts and Peterborough, the Toronto Rugby Club were crowned District 1 champions.

Standings

Schedule

Postseason

References

Toronto Argonauts seasons